Uggeshall is a village and civil parish in the East Suffolk district, in the county of Suffolk, England, located approximately 6 miles (10 km) south of Beccles and 4 miles (6km) north east of Halesworth close to the A145. The mid-2005 population estimate for Uggeshall parish was 170, reducing to 145 at the 2011 Census. Sotherton is located just to the south-west, Wangford to the south-east and Brampton and Stoven to the north.

The parish church is dedicated to St Mary and is one of only a handful with a thatched tower.

References

External links

Villages in Suffolk
Civil parishes in Suffolk
Waveney District